Battle of Mount Tabor may refer to several events in history, including:
 Battle of Mount Tabor (biblical), in the time of the Book of Judges
 Battle of Mount Tabor (67), during Vespasian's campaign
 Battle of Mount Tabor (1799), during Napoleon's campaign